This list includes commanders of the First Army of Turkey, who were, in their time of service, nominal heads of the First Army, one of the four field armies of the Turkish Land Forces.

The current Commander of the First Army is Lieutenant General Kemal Yeni, since 24 August 2021.

See also
 Chief of the Turkish General Staff
 List of commanders of the Turkish Land Forces

References

Sources
 Haşim Söylemez, "Birinci Ordu, kıt’a dur!", Aksiyon, Sayı: 778 / Tarih: 2 November 2009. 

Commanders of the First Army
Commanders of First Army